Terry Brands (born April 9, 1968) is an American Olympic wrestler who won a bronze medal at the 2000 Summer Olympics, after losing the semi-final match to the Iranian wrestler, Alireza Dabir. While wrestling at the University of Iowa, Brands won NCAA titles in 1990 and 1992, both at 126 pounds. He was a two-time world freestyle champion at 58 kg, winning titles in 1993 and 1995. Terry became the head wrestling coach at The University of Tennessee at Chattanooga where he coached the likes of Christopher Bird and Matthew Wilbanks. Terry also served as an assistant coach at Montana State-Northern.

His twin brother, Tom Brands, a fellow wrestler, won a gold medal in the 1996 Summer Olympics. Brands grew up in Sheldon, Iowa. After serving as resident coach for the United States Olympic Training Center in Colorado Springs, Colorado, he currently is Associate Head Coach for the University of Iowa Hawkeyes, serving under his twin brother, head coach Tom Brands.

Brands lost to Kendall Cross in the 1996 Olympic trials. Cross went on to win the gold medal in Atlanta. Brands reached the Olympics in 2000 and won a bronze medal.

Terry Brands now serves as the Associate Head Coach at the University of Iowa.  Since coaching at Iowa he has set school records for the longest dual unbeaten (84), longest winning streak (69), and most dual shutouts (8).  He also coaches the Hawkeye Wrestling Club and was named the 2014 Terry McCann Freestyle Coach of the Year.

In 2006, Brands was inducted into the National Wrestling Hall of Fame as a Distinguished Member.

References

External links 
 FILA Wrestling Database
Terry Brands Rokfin Channel

1968 births
Living people
Wrestlers at the 2000 Summer Olympics
American male sport wrestlers
Olympic bronze medalists for the United States in wrestling
Iowa Hawkeyes wrestlers
American twins
Twin sportspeople
People from Sheldon, Iowa
World Wrestling Champions
Medalists at the 2000 Summer Olympics
Pan American Games gold medalists for the United States
Pan American Games medalists in wrestling
Wrestlers at the 1995 Pan American Games
Medalists at the 1995 Pan American Games
20th-century American people
21st-century American people